Riley Creek is a tributary of Middle Creek, which in turn is a tributary of the Tahltan River, part of the Stikine River watershed in northwest part of the province of British Columbia, Canada. Riley Creek's watershed's land cover is classified as 39.9% shrubland, 36.8% conifer forest, 20.3% mixed forest, and small amounts of other cover.

Riley Creek is in the traditional territory of the Tahltan First Nation, of the Tahltan people.

Geography
From its source near Classy Creek, Mansfield Creek, and Hartz Creek, Riley creek flows generally south and through a forested gorge to Middle Creek, which in turn empties into the Tahltan River.

See also
List of British Columbia rivers

References 

Cassiar Land District
Level Mountain
Nahlin Plateau
Rivers of British Columbia
Stikine Country
Tahltan